Cyrus Yavneh (October 14, 1942  January 26, 2018) was an American television and film producer, most known for his producing role on the Fox action series 24 and The CW series Supernatural.

Biography 
Born in New York to a Belarusian Jewish father (Zalman) and a Sabra (native Israeli) mother (Anna), Yavneh was an alumnus of City College of New York. He worked as a musician and bottle washer before entering the entertainment business, beginning with an assistant director position on the CBS series Lou Grant.

Yavneh produced 34 episodes of 24, and received a Producers Guild of America Award for Best Episodic Drama as well as a Primetime Emmy Award.

In addition to television, Yavneh produced the 1994 Saturday Night Live spinoff movie It's Pat, as well as Warren Beatty's Town & Country and Arnold Schwarzenegger's directorial debut Christmas in Connecticut. Prior to his death, he was working on the Netflix comedy Insatiable.

Yavneh died of lung cancer on January 26, 2018, in Santa Monica at the age of 75. His funeral was held at Mount Sinai Memorial Park Cemetery.

References

External links
Cyrus Yavneh at the Internet Movie Database

1942 births
2018 deaths
American film producers
American television producers
American people of Belarusian-Jewish descent
American people of Israeli descent
Deaths from lung cancer in California
Television producers from New York City
Film producers from New York (state)